The 2013–14 season was Lille OSC's seventieth season in existence and the club's fourteenth consecutive season in the top flight of French football. For the first time since the 2008–09 season, the club failed to qualify for any European competition and therefore only participated in domestic competitions (Ligue 1, Coupe de France and Coupe de la Ligue).

For the season, Lille announced René Girard as the replacement to departing manager Rudi Garcia, who joined Italian side Roma.

Players

Squad

Source:

Transfers in

Transfers out

Appearances and goals

Last updated: 17 May 2014
Source: Match reports in Competitive matches, Ligue1.com

Goalscorers

Last updated: 17 May 2014
Source: Match reports in Competitive matches

Club

Coaching staff

Board

Kit

The 2013–14 Kits are produced by Nike and were revealed on 9 July 2013.

Pre-season and friendlies

Competitions

Ligue 1

League table

Results summary

Results by match

Matches

Coupe de France

Coupe de la Ligue

References

Lille OSC seasons
Lille OSC